Glenn Payne (born 24 September 1958) is a former Australian rules footballer who played with North Melbourne in the Victorian Football League (VFL).

Notes

External links 

Living people
1958 births
Australian rules footballers from Victoria (Australia)
North Melbourne Football Club players